Adventureland is one of the "themed lands" at the many Disneyland-style theme parks run by the Walt Disney Company around the world. It is themed to resemble the remote jungles in Africa, Asia, South America, Oceania and the Caribbean. "To create a land that would make this dream reality", said Walt Disney, "We pictured ourselves far from civilization, in the remote jungles of Asia and Africa."

Adventureland provides a 1950s view of exotic adventure, capitalizing on the post-war Tiki craze. Lush vegetation resembles jungles while elements of the "other" surround the visitor. Tribal performance masks, conga drums, non-American totem poles, exotic animal statues, and architecture of Pacific influence make for a confined area wherein industry and technology take a back seat to uncharted nature. Noted art historian David T. Doris explains Adventureland as, "a pastiche of imaginary colonial spaces, conflated within the green and foliate milieu of "the Jungle."

Disneyland 

Disneyland's Adventureland was originally envisioned as True-Life Adventureland, and was to be based on Walt's famous award-winning nature documentaries on Africa and Asia. The land was originally supposed to have real animals from Africa to inhabit a jungle river, but after zoologists told Walt the real animals would lie around or hide, the imagineers built mechanical animals instead. Adventureland opened with the Jungle Cruise as its star attraction, until the Swiss Family Treehouse was added years later. With the groundbreaking technology of audio animatronics Walt Disney's Enchanted Tiki Room was added nearby the land's entry bridge. Oceanic Arts also created the series of tribal masks that now line the entry bridge.

Many years later, Indiana Jones Adventure was added with the expansion of Adventureland and gave the entire land a 1930s theme, which concurs with the setting created by the rustic boats of the Jungle Cruise and the voice character Albert Awol who plays big band music from the 1930s. In 1999, the Swiss Family Treehouse was transformed into Tarzan's Treehouse. Adventureland has remained the same since, until 2008 with the former summer event, Indiana Jones Summer of Hidden Mysteries.

Attractions and entertainment 
 Indiana Jones Adventure (1995–present)
 Jungle Cruise (1955–present)
 Walt Disney's Enchanted Tiki Room (1963–present)

Upcoming attractions and entertainment 
 Adventureland Treehouse (opening in 2023)

Former attractions and entertainment 
 Magnolia Park (1955–1962)
 Swiss Family Treehouse (1962–1999)
 Big Game Safari Shooting Gallery (1962–1982)
 Aladdin's Oasis Dinner Show (1993–1997)
 Aladdin's Oasis (1993–2008)
 Tarzan's Treehouse (1999–2021)

Restaurants and refreshments 
 Bengal Barbecue
 Tiki Juice Bar
 Tropical Imports
 Captain Hook’s Galley
 The Tropical Hideaway

Former restaurants and refreshments 
 Tropical Cantina (1955–1962)
 Sunkist I Presume (1962–1992)
 Tahitian Terrace (1962–1993)
 Indy Fruit Cart (1995–2006)

Shops 
 Adventureland Bazaar

Former shops 
 Tiki's Tropical Traders (1955–1966+)
 Safari Outpost (1986–1995)
 Indiana Jones Adventure Outpost (1995-2017)
 South Seas Traders (1984-2017)

Magic Kingdom 

The Adventureland at Walt Disney World is divided into two main sub-areas, one being the Arabian Village and the other one being Caribbean Plaza, which is home to Pirates of the Caribbean. The original Polynesian motif is still visible with the prominence of jungle surrounding the Swiss Family Treehouse and Walt Disney's Enchanted Tiki Room. The 1930s adventurer/explorer vibe is clear with the background music heard over loud projecting speakers recently installed throughout Adventureland with a different vibe than that of Disneyland's, but with similar Big Band music and witty announcements. The Magic Carpets of Aladdin attraction was unique to this version of Adventureland before the opening of Tokyo DisneySea and Walt Disney Studios Park in Paris.

Attractions and entertainment 
 Jungle Cruise (1971–present)
 The Magic Carpets of Aladdin (2001–present)
 Pirates of the Caribbean (1973–present)
 The Pirates League
 Swiss Family Treehouse (1971–present)
 Walt Disney's Enchanted Tiki Room (1971–1997, 2011–present)
 Pirate's Adventure (Treasures of Seven Seas)

Former attractions and entertainment 
 The Enchanted Tiki Room (Under New Management) (1998–2011)
 Tinker Bell's Magical Nook (2011–2014)

Restaurants and refreshments 
 Aloha Isle
 Captain Hook’s Galley
 Colonel Hathi's Pizza Outpost
 Mushu’s Cuisines
 Tortuga Tavern (formerly El Pirata Y El Perico Restaurante)
 Sunshine Tree Terrace
 Skipper's Canteen

Former restaurants and refreshments 
 Adventureland Veranda (1971–1994)

Shops 
 Agrabah Bazaar
 Island Supply by Sunglass Hut
 Plaza del Sol Caribe Bazaar
 Zanzibar Trading Co
 Bwana Bob's

Former shops 
 Tiki Tropic Shop (1971–2000)
 The Magic Carpet (1971–1987)
 Traders of Timbuktu (1971–2000)
 Oriental Imports (1971–1987)
 Tropic Toppers (1971–1988)
 The House of Treasure (located in Caribbean Plaza, 1973–2001)
 The Golden Galleon and La Princesa de Cristal (also located in Caribbean Plaza, 1974–1992)
 The Pirate's Arcade (Caribbean Plaza, 1974–1980)

While the House of Treasure opened originally when the Pirates premiered in December 1973, it started fully operating in February 1974 according to a March 1974 issue of "Eyes and Ears", a cast member newsletter for Walt Disney World.

Tokyo Disneyland 

Tokyo Disneyland's Adventureland is a mish-mash of the various Adventureland interpretations. It features a unique ride - the Western River Railroad - and a Lilo & Stitch-themed version of Walt Disney's Enchanted Tiki Room. It features a pair of sub-lands: The Typhoon Lagoon inspired Coral Landing near the Swiss Family Treehouse and another one based on New Orleans Square at Disneyland, which features Pirates of the Caribbean. World Bazaar's buildings fade into New Orleans.

Attractions and entertainment 
 The Enchanted Tiki Room: Stitch Presents Aloha e Komo Mai! (2008–present)
 Jungle Cruise (1983–present)
 Theatre Orleans
 Jamboree Mickey! Let's Dance!
 Polynesian Terrace Show
 Pirates Brass
 Pirates of the Caribbean (1983–present)
 Swiss Family Treehouse (1993–present)
 Western River Railroad (1983–present)

Former attractions and entertainment 
 Walt Disney's Enchanted Tiki Room (1983–1999)
 The Enchanted Tiki Room: Now Playing "Get the Fever!" (1999–2008)
 Adventureland Stage (1983–2000)
 Adventureland Revue (1984–1993)
 Sebastian's Caribbean Carnival (1993–1996)
 Fiesta Tropical (1996–2000)
 Polynesian Terrace Show
 Mickey & Minnie's Polynesian Paradise (2009–2015)
 Lilo's Luau & Fun (2005–2020)
 Mickey's Rainbow Luau (2015-2020)
 Theatre Orleans
 Mickey's Adventureland Mardi Gras (2001–2004)
 Minnie Oh! Minnie (2004–2018)
 Let's Party Gras! (2018-2020)
 Jungle Rhythms (2016–2020)
 Jungle SounDuo

Restaurants and refreshments 
 Royal Street Veranda
 Blue Bayou Restaurant
 Café Orleans
 The Gazebo
 Crystal Palace Restaurant
 Moana’s Polynesian Terrace Restaurant
 Parkside Wagon
 Boiler Room Bites
 China Voyager
 Squeezer's Tropical Juice Bar
 Fresh Fruit Oasis
 The Skipper's Galley

Shops 
 The Golden Galleon
 Pirate Treasure
 Cristal Arts
 La Petite Parfumerie
 Party Gras Gifts
 Adventureland Bazaar
 Le Marché Bleu

Disneyland Park (Paris) 
The European Adventureland is geographically switched with Frontierland, compared to the American parks. It contains more heavy Indian and Moroccan influences. It features four themed areas:
 The first, known as Adventureland Bazar, is a recreation of an oriental city from the 1001 Arabian Nights, presumably Agrabah from the Disney movie Aladdin (Imagineers were designing the entrance area of this Adventureland while the film was in production). In 1993, the attraction Le Passage Enchanté d'Aladdin opened in this very area. During the Christmas and holiday season there is a Nativity scene with life-size figures displayed in this area of the park. The concept of this city eventually reached overseas resorts.
 The second part of Adventureland has a more African appearance, and is mainly composed of shops and restaurants (like the Hakuna Matata Restaurant).
 A third themed area represents Asian mysterious jungles, themed to explorers and featuring the Indiana Jones et le Temple du Péril roller coaster.
 The last part, and the biggest, is a Caribbean area, covering most of the surface of Adventureland. It features the ride Pirates of the Caribbean and Adventure Isle, a Tom Sawyer Island-like walkthrough spot, with some attractions like Swiss Family Treehouse or Captain Hook's Pirate Ship. There is also a small pleasure beach in this part of Adventureland which is open to swimmers during the summer months.

This Adventureland presented some construction problems, mainly due to the unsuitable local climate. Growing exotic jungles in a place where winters could be harsh was a tough task. This is also the reason why there is no Jungle Cruise ride, since most animatronics animals would have been exposed to this weather. However, abandoned ideas intended to build an adequate ride under a glass roof, but that never came true.

There is no Tiki Room attraction either, although the Explorers Club Restaurant (now Colonel Hathi's Outpost) features animatronics birds that used to sing.

Attractions and entertainment 
 Adventure Isle (1992–present)
 La Plage des Pirates
 La Cabane des Robinson - (Swiss Family Treehouse) (1992–present)
 Le Passage Enchanté d'Aladdin - (Aladdin's Enchanted Passage) (1993–present)
 Pirates of the Caribbean (1992–present)
 Rhythm of the Jungle
 Indiana Jones et le Temple du Péril - (Indiana Jones and the Temple of Peril) (1993–present)

Former attractions and entertainment 
 Adventureland Rhythms of the Jungle
 Aladdin's Magic Lamp
 Following the Leader with Peter Pan
 Make a Wish - Peter Pan to the Rescue

Restaurants and refreshments 
 Colonel Hathi's Pizza Outpost
 Adventureland Bazaar
 Hakuna Matata Restaurant
 Le Café de la Brousse
 Restaurant Agrabah Café
 Dragon chaud chinois de Mushu
 Coolpost
 Captain Hook's Galley
 Le pub Admiral Benbow
 Le Comptoir du Capitaine
 Captain Jack Restaurant (formerly Blue Lagoon Restaurant)

Former restaurants and refreshments 
 Les Epices Enchantées (1992–1995)
 Explorers Club (1992–1995)
 The Bazar (1992–1999)

Shops 
 Les Trésors de Shéhérazade (Shahrazade's Treasures)
 La Girafe Curieuse (The Curious Giraffe)
 Indiana Jones Adventure Outpost
 Temple Traders Boutique
 Le Coffre du Capitaine (The Captain's Chest)

Hong Kong Disneyland 

Hong Kong Disneyland's Adventureland is the biggest among all Disney parks and features a large island area home to Tarzan's Treehouse, which is circled by the Jungle Cruise, not much like the Rivers of America in most Magic Kingdom–style parks' Adventureland area. It is also home to the "Festival of the Lion King" show.

In early May to August 2007, the land was converted into Pirateland, in conjunction with the release of the film Pirates of the Caribbean: At World's End.

The outer edge of the land was under construction from early May to September 2008, adjacent to Festival of The Lion King. A temporary structure was built for Demon Jungle, an exclusive attraction for the 2008–2010 Halloween seasons, and transformed to The Revenge of the Headless Horseman for the 2011–2014 Halloween seasons; it is now home to introduced its all-new “Black Box” space" known as "The Pavilion", a flexible event venue. Unlike the other parks, there is still no Pirates of the Caribbean at this location yet.

On September 1, 2017, the area around the bridge that near the entrance of the theme land and in front of Tahitian Terence has surround by fences hiding the works starting recently for "Moana: A Homecoming Celebration" opening on 2018, as part of its multiyear expansion plan for the Park since November 22, 2016.

Attractions and entertainment 
 Festival of the Lion King (2005–present)
 Jungle River Cruise (2005–present)
 Karibuni Marketplace
 Liki Tikis
 Moana: A Homecoming Celebration
 Rafts to Tarzan's Treehouse
 Street Entertainment at Adventureland
 Tarzan's Treehouse (2005–present)

Former attractions and entertainment 
 Lucky the Dinosaur (2005–2006)
 Jungle Puppet Carnival (2005–2009)

Restaurants and refreshments 
 Korean Squid, Turkey Leg, Refreshing Drinks, & Frozen Lollipop Cart
 Korean Squid & Turkey Leg Cart
 River View Cafe
 Moana’s Tahitian Terrace

Shops 
 Professor Porter's Trading Post

Shanghai Disneyland Park 
Shanghai Disneyland Park features an area similar to the "Adventurelands" found at other Disney parks, named Adventure Isle. Just like "Adventureland" at Disneyland Paris, "Adventure Isle" does not include a Jungle Cruise attraction, and instead features a ropes course called "Camp Discovery", a dinosaur-themed rapids attraction named "Roaring Rapids and Soaring Over the Horizon. This version is also different in the fact that it is on the right side of the main hub instead of being on the left.

The land's story focuses around a group called the League of Adventurers, who came upon the island after their airship was driven off course in the 1930s. Befriending the native Arbori tribe, they have been engaged in studying their culture and the island ever since. Each attraction is tied to a Guardian Animal in the Arbori mythology: Roaring Rapids is the realm of Q'aráq; a giant crocodilian Guardian of Water, Soaring Over the Horizon is located in a celestial temple to Q'otar; a condor spirit of the air, and Camp Discovery lies in the realm of Q'ai; the fanged cat guardian of the earth.

Attractions and entertainment 
 Camp Discovery
 Explorer Canoes
 Happy Circle
 Roaring Rapids (2016–present)
 Soaring Over the Horizon (2016–present)

Former attractions and entertainment 
 Tarzan: Call of the Jungle (2016–2019)

Restaurants and refreshments 
 Tribal Table
 Piranha Bites

Shops 
 Chip 'n Dale's Trading Post (formerly Laughing Monkey Traders)
 Rainbow Frog Trinkets

In popular culture 
In the Epic Mickey series, Wasteland's version of Adventureland is Ventureland. Its main elements is the movie Peter Pan and the Pirates of the Caribbean attraction.

References 

 
Themed areas in Walt Disney Parks and Resorts
Disneyland
Magic Kingdom
Tokyo Disneyland
Disneyland Park (Paris)
Hong Kong Disneyland
Shanghai Disneyland
Amusement parks opened in 1955
1955 establishments in California